Matthew Peter Dominic Bullock (born 9 September 1949) is a former banker and chief executive. From 2014 until 2019, he was Master of St Edmund's College, Cambridge.

The son of the historian Alan Bullock and his wife Hilda (née Handy), he was educated at Magdalen College School, Oxford and Peterhouse, Cambridge, graduating with a degree in History in 1970. From 1999 to 2011 he was the Chief Executive of Norwich and Peterborough Building Society. In 2011 the building society was fined £1.4 million by the Financial Services Authority for mis-selling high-risk investments to 3,200 customers. The society has made £51 million in compensation payments and the society has apologised for the hardship and anxiety suffered by its customers.

In his role as Master of St Edmund's College he presided over the expansion of the College to incorporate the Mount Pleasant Halls development, as well as the dismissal of an honorary research fellow, Noah Carl, after he was found to have activities and connections linking him to conservative academics. Noah Carl subsequently filed an employment tribunal claim against the university for unfair dismissal.

References

1949 births
Living people
British bankers
British chief executives
Masters of St Edmund's College, Cambridge
Younger sons of barons
Alumni of Peterhouse, Cambridge
People educated at Magdalen College School, Oxford